Monsieur Ibrahim (original title: Monsieur Ibrahim et les fleurs du Coran; (Mister Ibrahim and the Flowers of the Qur'an) is a 2003 French drama film starring Omar Sharif, and directed by François Dupeyron. The film is based on a book and a play by Éric-Emmanuel Schmitt.

Plot summary
The story unfolds in a working-class neighborhood in the Paris of the 1960s. The protagonist, Moїse Schmidt (Momo), is a young Jewish boy growing up without a mother and with a father afflicted by crippling depression. Momo is fascinated by the elderly Turkish Muslim man, Ibrahim Demirci, who runs a grocery store across the street from his apartment (where Momo often shoplifts). Their relationship develops and soon Momo feels closer to Ibrahim than to his father. Ibrahim affectionately calls Moїse Momo, and adopts him when his father leaves and commits suicide. Momo and Ibrahim go on a journey in their new car (a Simca Aronde Océane) to Turkey, Ibrahim's native country, where Momo learns about Ibrahim's culture. At the end of their adventure, Ibrahim is killed in a car crash and Momo returns to Paris to take over the shop.

Cast
Monsieur Ibrahim – Omar Sharif
Momo – Pierre Boulanger
Momo's father – Gilbert Melki
Momo's mother – Isabelle Renauld
Myriam – Lola Naymark
Sylvie – Anne Suarez
Fatou – Mata Gabin
Eva – Celine Samie
The Movie Star – Isabelle Adjani

Awards and nominations
 César Award, Best Actor 2004: Omar Sharif
 Chicago International Film Festival, Silver Hugo for Best Male Performance 2003: Pierre Boulanger
 Venice International Film Festival, Audience Award, Best Actor 2003: Omar Sharif

Also nominated for several awards, including the 2004 Golden Globe for Best Foreign Language Film.

See also
Sufism

References

External links

Sony website for Monsieur Ibrahim
"What is in it", a related Sufi tale from Idries Shah's Wisdom of the Idiots

2003 films
2003 drama films
Sony Pictures Classics films
Films featuring a Best Actor César Award-winning performance
Films directed by François Dupeyron
Films about race and ethnicity
Films based on multiple works
Islamic and Jewish interfaith dialogue
Sufism
French drama films
2000s French films
2000s French-language films